

The Sparmann S-1 was a 1930s Swedish military training monoplane, designed by Edmund Sparmann, built in small numbers for the Swedish Air Force. The S-1 was a single-seat low-wing braced-monoplane with a fixed trail-skid landing gear. It was powered by a single 130 hp (97 kW) de Havilland Gipsy Major engine.

Operators

Swedish Air Force

Specifications

See also

References

Further reading
 
 

1930s Swedish military trainer aircraft